Interleukin 10 (Il-10) is an anti-inflammatory cytokine. IL-10 may also refer to:

 Ilyushin Il-10, a Soviet aircraft of World War II
 Interleukin 10, an anti-inflammatory cytokine
 Illinois's 10th congressional district
 Illinois Route 10